Surkh Dheri is a village in Mardan District, Khyber Pakhtunkhwa), Pakistan.

Demographics and culture
The population of Surkh Dheri is about 6000 to 7000. The dominant language in this village is the Pashto. Islam is the dominant religion and culture. The people of Surkh Dheri wear Shalwar kameez.

Problems
Gas and electricity are major problems. The people use gas cylinders for their cooking.

References

Villages in Khyber Pakhtunkhwa
Populated places in Mardan District